Llandinam is a village and community in Montgomeryshire, Powys, central Wales, between Newtown and Llanidloes, located on the A470. As a community, Llandinam is made up of the village itself, small hamlets including Plas Dinam and Little London and several farms. The village itself has a population of around 576 with 56% born in Wales.

History and notable people
Llandinam was the family home of David Davies (1818–1890) who was responsible for much of the development of the South Wales Valleys and the export of coal in the 19th century. His grandson David Davies, 1st Baron Davies FRGS (1880–1944) became MP for Montgomeryshire from 1906 to 1929.

The parents of Murray Humphreys (1899–1965), one of Chicago's most feared Prohibition gangsters, emigrated to the United States from the village in the late 1890s.

Gordonstoun school was evacuated here for the duration of World War II.  The village was previously served by Llandinam railway station on the Llanidloes and Newtown Railway.

Governance
An electoral ward in the same name existed, which also covered the neighbouring community of Mochdre. The population of this ward at the 2011 census was 1,405. It elected its first Conservative County Councillor in May 2017. From the 2022 local election the Llandinam ward became 'Llandinam and Dolfor', following the merger with part of the neighbouring Kerry community. It continued to be represented by one county councillor.

Notable buildings

St Llonio's Church
St Llonio's Church is located immediately north of the village centre, on a spur jutting into the Severn Valley, and within a fortified promontory fort, the defensive bank forming, until recently, the northern boundary of the church. It was originally the mother church of those at Llanidloes and Llanwnnog, serving a monastery until the late 13th century. It is claimed that the church dates back to AD 520. It was initially a clas structure, with its western tower containing a pyramidal slate roof over a timber belfry, dating from the 13th century. It is recorded as Ecclesia de Landinam in the Norwich Taxation of 1254 with a value of £1 6s 8d. The majority of the church was rebuilt in the 19th century, coinciding with the restoration by George Edmund Street. The church still retains some original features, however, most notably the northern wall of the chancel.

The church has a wooden reredos, two old tomb recesses in the sanctuary, a damaged perpendicular font and a number of 17th-century carved choir stalls. The square western tower probably dates from the 13th century with its timber belfry designed in Marches style. Rebuilding culminated in 1864-65 and left only the north wall of the chancel remaining from the previous design. During the restoration, new windows in square headed frames were inserted throughout the church and all the windows were replaced in neo-Gothic style. In the centre of the burial ground, to the south-west of the church, is an ancient yew tree claimed to be around 800 years old. South-west of the yew is a large oak tree. There is another large yew to the north-west of the churchyard several Irish yews on the west side. The churchyard contains the war graves of three Royal Welsh Fusiliers soldiers of World War I.

The church, which is a Grade II listed building lies in the Church in Wales parish of Bro Arwystli. It has its own Facebook page, which features photographs of some of its unique architectural features.

Llandinam Bridge
The bridge from the main road over towards Broneirion was the first cast iron bridge constructed in the county, designed by Thomas Penson and built by Davies 1846. It spans 90 feet (27.5 m). At the east end of the bridge there is a statue of David Davies.

Broneirion
The house that David Davies built, Broneirion, remains an elegant country mansion owned by Girlguiding Cymru.

Plâs Dinam
Plâs Dinam was bought by David Davies for his son, Edward. Designed by William Eden Nesfield in 1873-1874, it is a Grade II* listed building. Its garden is listed at Grade II on the Cadw/ICOMOS Register of Parks and Gardens of Special Historic Interest in Wales.

References

External links
Photos of Llandinam and surrounding area on geograph.org
Village Website

Historic Montgomeryshire Parishes
Villages in Powys
Registered historic parks and gardens in Powys
Populated places on the River Severn
Former wards of Powys